The York Conservation Trust is a trust that buys and restores significant historical buildings in York, England, and then makes them available to rent.

It was originally an initiative of former Lord Mayor John Bowes Morrell, who started acquiring old buildings when he bought Sir Thomas Herbert's House on Pavement in 1943. Together with his brother, Cuthbert, Morrell set up the Ings Property Company, a not-for-profit exercise in practical conservation. In 1976 this company was given charitable status and evolved into York Conservation Trust.

The Trust owns properties throughout York in streets such as Walmgate, Micklegate, Low Ousegate, Goodramgate, Gillygate and Stonegate. Among its portfolio are The Red House in Duncombe Place, the York Assembly Rooms in Blake Street and the De Grey Rooms next to York Theatre Royal and leased to them. The Trust also bought Fairfax House from York Civic Trust and rents it back to them.  Recent acquisitions include Bowes Morrell House, Walmgate, and 56 Bootham, better known as York Register Office. The Trust was unable to acquire Morrell's Victorian mansion, Burton Croft, before its demolition by developers.

York Conservation Trust has published for sale a book York Conservation Trust - Historical Properties Walking Guide. This lists the properties it owns, gives historical and descriptive information and encourages walking around York to view them.

All of the trustees are related to John Bowes Morrell; three of them are his grandsons, and six his great grandchildren.

References

External links
York Conservation Trust website

Organisations based in York